Hyperaspis is a genus of lady beetles in the family Coccinellidae. There are more than 100 described species in Hyperaspis.

See also
 List of Hyperaspis species

References

Further reading

 
 

Coccinellidae
Coccinellidae genera